Frank A. Barnhart is an American actor, producer, director, and college professor. An openly gay man, his primary work is in Gay and Lesbian Theatre. He was responsible for moving "The National Gay and Lesbian Theatre Festival" to Columbus, Ohio in 2002. He was director of The Columbus National Gay and Lesbian Theatre Festival through 2006. In 2003 he received the OOBR Award for Outstanding off-off Broadway Play for his production of Members of the Tribe. His one-man version of Marlowe's Edward the Second, titled One Edward 2, played the Wings Theatre in NYC in 1997.  He is the former executive director of Actors' Theatre of Columbus, Ohio, which produces classic theater in a wonderful outdoor setting in the heart of German Village.

Frank Barnhart is also a professor for theater and communication at Columbus State Community College located in Columbus Ohio.

HONORS AND AWARDS
Forte Award, Gay Men's Chorus   2011
Outstanding Director, Central Ohio Theatre Roundtable	2007,2008,2011
Critic’s Circle Award, Central Ohio Critic’s Circle	2004
Outstanding Production, OOBR Award, (Off-off Broadway Review)	2003
Community Service Award, Stonewall Union	2003
Harold Award, Theatre Roundtable	2002
Critic’s Circle Award, Central Ohio Critic’s Circle	2002
Community Service Award, Stonewall Union	1997
Critic’s Circle Award, Central Ohio Critic’s Circle	1997
Citation in the Arts, State of Ohio	1992
Citation, Who's Who in Society and Business	1992

References

External links
www.columbustheatrefestival.com

Year of birth missing (living people)
Living people
American gay actors
American male stage actors
American theatre directors
LGBT theatre directors